Héctor Marcó or stage name Hector Domingo Marcolongo (1906–1987) was an Argentine lyricist who focused mainly on the tango genre.

Tango Compositions
Well Frappé
My Soul
Heart
Alley
In a kiss of life
Porteño
Four lives
The white chapel
Porteño and Dancer
Nido gaucho
I love you
Whiskey
Argentine goal
Leather ball with Edmundo Rivero

Argentine composers
People from Buenos Aires
1906 births
1987 deaths
20th-century composers